Events from the year 1839 in Denmark.

Incumbents
 Monarch – Frederick VI (until 3 December), then Christian VIII
 Prime minister – Otto Joachim

Events

Undated

Births
 25 January – Frederikke Federspiel, photographer (died 1913)
 6 February – Caroline Testman, women's rights activist  (d. 1919)
 18 February – Hermann Baagøe Storck, architect (died 1922)
 13 March – Tage Reedtz-Thott, politician, prime minister of Denmark (died 1923)
 10 June –  Ludvig Holstein-Ledreborg, politician, prime minister of Denmark (died 1912)
 26 August – Kristen Feilberg, photographer (died 1919)
 23 September - Wilhelmine Schröder, royal favorite  (died 1924)
 2 October – Hans Smidth, artist (died 1917)
 4 December  Louise Hegermann-Lindencrone, playwright and salonist (died 1833)

Deaths
 29 March –  Giuseppe Siboni opera singer and director (b. 1780)
 18 August  Bendix Frantz Ludwig Schow, mayor (born 1778)
 3 December – Frederick VI, King of Denmark (born 1768)

References

 
1830s in Denmark
Denmark
Years of the 19th century in Denmark